uMzinyathi is one of the 11 district municipalities ("districts") of KwaZulu-Natal province in South Africa. The seat of uMzinyathi is Dundee. The majority of its 456 452 people speak IsiZulu (2001 Census). The district code is DC24

Geography

Neighbours
Umzinyathi is surrounded by:
 Amajuba in the north (DC25)
 Zululand in the north-east (DC26)
 uThungulu in the east (DC28)
 iLembe in the south-east (DC29)
 uMgungundlovu in the south-west (DC22)
 Uthukela in the west (DC23)

Local municipalities
The district contains the following local municipalities:

Demographics
The following statistics are from the 2001 census.

Gender

Ethnic group

Age

Politics

Election results
Election results for Umzinyathi in the South African general election, 2004.
 Population 18 and over: 224 263 [49.13% of total population]
 Total votes: 122 689 [26.88% of total population]
 Voting % estimate: 54.71% votes as a % of population 18 and over

See also
 Municipal Demarcation Board

References

External links 
 Official Website

District Municipalities of KwaZulu-Natal
Umzinyathi District Municipality